The 2017 Women's EuroHockey Championship III was the 7th edition of the Women's EuroHockey Championship III. It was held in Sveti Ivan Zelina, Croatia from 30 July until 5 August 2017. The tournament also served as a qualifier for the 2019 Women's EuroHockey Championship II, with the winner qualifying.

Format
The five teams were placed in a single pool. Each team played the other four teams once. The final results from those games are also the final standings with the first ranked team qualifying for the 2019 Women's EuroHockey Championship II.

Results
All times are local (UTC+2).

Pool A

See also
2017 Men's EuroHockey Championship III
2017 Women's EuroHockey Championship II

References

Women's EuroHockey Championship III
EuroHockey Championship III
EuroHockey Championship III
International women's field hockey competitions hosted by Croatia
EuroHockey Championship III
Women 3